The Cypriot Canzoniere (Song-book) οr the Cypriot Rime d'Amore (Love Rhymes; Greek: Ρίμες Αγάπης) is a collection of 16th century poems in the Cypriot dialect influenced by the Italian Renaissance poetry and especially Petrarchism. They were written by a one or more, anonymous Cypriot poets that were directly influenced by Italian poetry. The manuscript consists of 156 poems focusing mostly on love themes. Some of the poems are direct translations of Petrarch and Sannazaro. They are the first poems directly influenced by the Renaissance in the Greek language, for example they introduced the ottava and terza. The societal, cultural and musical norms in Venetian Cyprus are documented by the chronicler Etienne Lusignan and help shed light into the references of the poems.  

The poems survive in a single manuscript, codex IX 32, currently located at the Marcian Library in Venice. They were first published by the French philologist Émile Legrand in 1881.

See also 

 Cypriot dialect
 Venetian Cyprus
 Leontios Machairas
 Georgios Boustronios

References

Further reading 

 Émile Legrand. (1881). Bibliothèque Grecque Vulgaire II. 58-93.
 Θέμις Σιαπκαρά-Πιτσιλλίδου (ed.). (1976). Ο πετραρχισμός στην Κύπρο. Ρίμες αγάπης: από χειρόγραφο του 16ου αιώνα με μεταφορά στην κοινή μας γλώσσα. Τυπογραφείο Γ. Τσιβεριώτη, Athens.
 G. Zoras, (1976). Τα Κυπριακά ερωτικά ποιήματα του 16ου αιώνα. In: Parnassos 18, Athens, 469-474.

External links 
Some of the poems with commentary (in Greek).

Venetian Cyprus
Poetry anthologies
Cypriot literature